Raft Island is a private island and CDP located near the Pierce County community of Rosedale, Washington, United States. Gig Harbor, Washington is the nearest incorporated town, although unincorporated Artondale is much closer. The island features approximately 200 homes on 160 acres. All of these homes are served through the Gig Harbor post office.

Raft Island contains parks, roads, several private beaches, a private tennis court, private boat launch, and a church camp. Because of its picturesque setting, Raft Island has been the subject of many artistic pursuits. The island is connected to the mainland by a -long bridge.

The size varies between 160 and 201 acres (813,910 m²) in area depending on high or low tide, and is oval in shape. It is located in Henderson Bay within Puget Sound.

According to Edmond S. Meany, Raft Island was probably named from its appearance. In 1841 Charles Wilkes of the United States Exploring Expedition gave it the name "Allshouse Island", probably for Joseph Allshouse, a member of his crew.

References

External links
Raft Island Website
Raft Island: Blocks 1013 thru 1020, Census Tract 724.05, Pierce County, Washington United States Census Bureau
General population and housing data for Raft Island from the 2010 census.

Islands of Washington (state)
Islands of Pierce County, Washington
Islands of Puget Sound
Census-designated places in Pierce County, Washington
Census-designated places in Washington (state)
Private islands of Washington (state)